Napoleon Jinnies is an American cheerleader. In 2019, he and Quinton Peron were the first male National Football League (NFL) cheerleaders to perform during the Super Bowl. He joined the Los Angeles Rams squad in 2018.

The former Disney dancer and been featured in Abercrombie & Fitch's Fierce cologne campaign. He also featured in the brand's partnership with The Trevor Project.

Personal life
Jinnies is openly gay and a classically trained dancer. He was bullied for his sexual orientation when he was younger.

See also
 List of cheerleaders

References

Living people
Year of birth missing (living people)
American male dancers
Gay men
LGBT dancers
American LGBT people
Los Angeles Rams
National Football League cheerleaders